Lucinda Cowden (born 24 April 1965) is an Australian actress.

Cowden was born in Ballarat, Victoria. She played Melanie Pearson in the soap opera Neighbours from 1987 until 1991, with a cameo appearance in the 20th anniversary documentary in 2005. She reprised the role in January 2021.

Cowden left Neighbours in 1992, and later admitted that she did not want to be typecast. She then came over to the United Kingdom and appeared as Aladdin at the Marlowe Theatre in Canterbury. She also embarked on a 12-week tour of the UK as Peter Pan. Cowden presented the second season of the BBC children's television series, Parallel 9. She was a voice actress on the children's show The Koala Brothers.

Filmography

References

External links

1965 births
Australian soap opera actresses
Living people
20th-century Australian actresses
21st-century Australian actresses
Australian television actresses
Australian television presenters
Australian voice actresses